The 2017 Toledo Rockets football team represented the University of Toledo in the 2017 NCAA Division I FBS football season. They were led by second-year head coach Jason Candle and played their home games at the Glass Bowl as members of the West Division of the Mid-American Conference. They finished the season 11–3, 7–1 in MAC play to win the West Division. They defeated Akron in the MAC Championship game to become champions of the MAC. They received an invitation to the Dollar General Bowl where they lost to Appalachian State for the second consecutive year in a bowl game.

Previous season 
The Rockets finished the 2016 season 9–4, 6–2 in MAC play to finish in second place in the West Division. They were invited to the Camellia Bowl where they lost to Appalachian State.

Coaching staff

Source:

Schedule

Source:

Game summaries

Elon

at Nevada

Tulsa

at Miami (FL)

Eastern Michigan

at Central Michigan

Akron

at Ball State

Northern Illinois

at Ohio

at Bowling Green

Western Michigan

vs Akron–MAC Championship game

vs Appalachian State–Dollar General Bowl

References

Toledo
Toledo Rockets football seasons
Mid-American Conference football champion seasons
Toledo Rockets football